Dag Ole Thomassen (born 28 June 1986 in Skien) is a retired Norwegian football goalkeeper. He started and ended his senior career in Pors Grenland, intermittently playing first-tier football for Odd Grenland.

References

oddgrenland.no profile

Norwegian footballers
Pors Grenland players
Odds BK players
Sportspeople from Skien
1986 births
Living people
Eliteserien players
Norwegian First Division players
Norway youth international footballers
Association football goalkeepers